Jörgen Persson (born 22 April 1966, in Halmstad, Sweden) is a Swedish table tennis player. In two memorable World Table Tennis Championships finals he faced fellow Swede Jan-Ove Waldner in 1989 and 1991, losing the former and winning the latter. He also won four World Championship titles in Team.

Persson represented Sweden in every Olympic Games from when table tennis was introduced into the Olympic program in 1988 until 2012. After the 2012 Olympics he officially retired. Along with Croatian Zoran Primorac and Belgian Jean-Michel Saive, he was the first table tennis player to have competed at seven Olympic Games. His game is based on a powerful backhand stroke and a regular forehand.

His best Olympic result is a fourth place at the 2000 Summer Olympics and 2008 Summer Olympics.

See also
 List of table tennis players
 List of athletes with the most appearances at Olympic Games

References

External links
 
 
 

1966 births
Living people
Swedish male table tennis players
Olympic table tennis players of Sweden
Table tennis players at the 1988 Summer Olympics
Table tennis players at the 1992 Summer Olympics
Table tennis players at the 1996 Summer Olympics
Table tennis players at the 2000 Summer Olympics
Table tennis players at the 2004 Summer Olympics
Table tennis players at the 2008 Summer Olympics
Table tennis players at the 2012 Summer Olympics
Sportspeople from Halmstad
World Table Tennis Championships medalists
Sportspeople from Halland County